is a Japanese track and field sprinter who specialises in the 100 metres.

He was seventh in 100 m at the 58th National Sports Festival of Japan in 2003. After coming sixth over 200 m at the 2004 Japan Student Athletics Championships, he returned two years later to place runner-up in both short sprints. The 2006 Japan Championships in Athletics saw him with the 100 m title and take third in the 200 m.

Tsukahara represented Japan at the 2008 Summer Olympics in Beijing where he competed at the 100 metre sprint and placed second in his first heat after Churandy Martina in a time of 10.39 seconds. He qualified for the second round in which he improved his time to 10.23 seconds, finishing third behind Martina and Michael Frater. In the 100 m semi-finals Tsukahara achieved a time of 10.16 seconds, his best of the season, but finished in seventh place, failing to qualify for the final.

Together with Shingo Suetsugu, Shinji Takahira and Nobuharu Asahara, Tsukahara also competed in the 4x100 metres relay final at the 2008 Summer Olympics. In their qualification heat, the team placed second behind Trinidad and Tobago, ahead of the teams from the Netherlands and Brazil. Their time of 38.52 s was the third fastest out of sixteen participating nations in the first round and they qualified for the final. There they sprinted to a time of 38.15 seconds, placing third after the Jamaican and Trinidad teams, winning the bronze medal. However, in January 2017, Jamaica's gold medal was revoked after one of their athletes was found to have been doping, meaning that the Japanese team received silver. The achievement was a historic one in terms of Japanese olympians; it is the first track medal won by Japanese athletes in 80 years, as well as being the first medal won by male Japanese athletes.

Tsukahara had a strong start to the 2009 season, improving his 200 m best in early May to 20.61 s. He also set a new 100 m personal best at the 2009 Osaka Grand Prix. He easily won with a time of 10.13 seconds but still felt that he was capable of running faster.

National titles
Japan Championships in Athletics
100 metres: 2006, 2007, 2008

International competitions

Personal bests

Records
4×100 m relay
Former Asian record holder - 38.03 s (relay leg: 1st) (Osaka, 1 September 2007)

 with Shingo Suetsugu, Shinji Takahira, and Nobuharu Asahara

References

External links

Naoki Tsukahara at JAAF 

1985 births
Living people
Sportspeople from Nagano Prefecture
Japanese male sprinters
Olympic male sprinters
Olympic athletes of Japan
Olympic silver medalists for Japan
Olympic silver medalists in athletics (track and field)
Athletes (track and field) at the 2008 Summer Olympics
Medalists at the 2008 Summer Olympics
Asian Games silver medalists for Japan
Asian Games medalists in athletics (track and field)
Athletes (track and field) at the 2006 Asian Games
Athletes (track and field) at the 2010 Asian Games
Medalists at the 2006 Asian Games
World Athletics Championships athletes for Japan
Japan Championships in Athletics winners
Fujitsu people
Tokai University alumni
21st-century Japanese people